Metis Island is the 820 m long in east–west direction and 140 m wide rocky island separated from the west coast of Lavoisier Island in Biscoe Islands by a 540 m wide passage. Its surface area is 8.4 ha.

The feature is named after Metis, a deity of wisdom and deep thought in Greek mythology.

Location

Maps
 British Antarctic Territory. Scale 1:200000 topographic map. DOS 610 Series, Sheet W 66 66. Directorate of Overseas Surveys, UK, 1976
 Antarctic Digital Database (ADD). Scale 1:250000 topographic map of Antarctica. Scientific Committee on Antarctic Research (SCAR). Since 1993, regularly upgraded and updated

See also
 List of Antarctic and subantarctic islands

Notes

References
 Metis Island. SCAR Composite Gazetteer of Antarctica
 Bulgarian Antarctic Gazetteer. Antarctic Place-names Commission. (details in Bulgarian, basic data in English)

External links
 Metis Island. Copernix satellite image

Islands of the Biscoe Islands
Bulgaria and the Antarctic